Souk El Dziria or Souk of the Algerians is one of the souks of the medina of Tunis.

Etymology 
The origins of the souk's name is not clear. Some historians say Algerian sellers used to work in it while some others believe it was specialized in selling Algerian products.

Location 
The souk is located in the east of Al-Zaytuna Mosque. It is a small alley in Souk El Berka. That's why there are jewellerry shops in it.

Notes and references 

Dziria